Kinloch  is a hamlet and civil parish immediately north of the Loch of Drumellie, about  west of Blairgowrie in Perth and Kinross.

See also 
 List of listed buildings in Kinloch, Perth and Kinross

External links 
 The parish of Kinloch in the first Statistical Account of Scotland, 1796
 The parishes of Lethendy and Kinloch in the second Statistical Account of Scotland, 1845

References 

Villages in Perth and Kinross